"American Honky-Tonk Bar Association" is a song written by Bryan Kennedy and Jim Rushing and recorded by American country music singer Garth Brooks. It was released in September 1993 as the second single from his album In Pieces. The song reached the top of the Billboard Hot Country Singles & Tracks (now Hot Country Songs) chart.

Background
The song was originally titled "American Redneck Bar Association.".  Brooks provided the following background information on the song in the CD booklet liner notes from The Hits:

"'AHBA' is definitely one of the livelier moments in our live show.  The two writers of this song are not only great artists but have been extremely good friends to me since I moved to Nashville.  Jim Rushing's style of music like 'Sometimes Silence Says It All," I think, is what country music is all about.  Bryan Kennedy is one of the first guys I met at The Bluebird Cafe and he introduced me to his dad, Jerry Kennedy, who has been very, very good to me.  Here's to Jim Rushing at his great country music.  Here's to Bryan Kennedy... for his great friendship.  And here's to great horses, firm handshakes and great cods."

Content
This song is an uptempo honky-tonk anthem that compares bars to fraternal organizations or support groups for blue collar people. The song's title name is a pun on the name American Bar Association.

Critical reception
Mike Greenblatt of Modern Screen's Country Music referred to the song as a "modern day redneck classic sung with a snarl and a smile— except that ill-advised line about welfare recipients."

Chart positions

Year-end charts

References

1993 songs
1993 singles
Garth Brooks songs
Songs written by Jim Rushing
Song recordings produced by Allen Reynolds
Songs about alcohol
Liberty Records singles